Tzovinar (Ծովինար) or Nar (Նար) was the Armenian goddess of water, sea, and rain. She was a fierce goddess, who forced the rain to fall from the heavens with her fury.

Her name, Tzovinar, means "daughter of the seas" and she is identified as the mother of Sanasar and Baghdasar in Armenian epic tradition.

Name and etymology
Her name can be decomposed into two parts: Armenian/Old Armenian tzov 'sea, large body of water', and nar or Nar. The word cov is considered by some scholars to be a loanword from Urartian ṣûǝ, meaning '(inland) sea'. The second part is speculated to be related to Nara, a Hittite or Hurrian deity.

Scholar James R. Russell translates her name as 'Lady of the Lake', from cov ('sea') and Iranian nār ('woman'). Larisa Yeganyan translates the name as 'Marine' or 'Nymph of the Sea'. Tsovinar Harutyunyan interprets her name as "the sea", "the spirit of the sea" and "the light of the sea".

According to Armen Petrosyan, Covinar, a character in Armenian epic, is also called Covean or Coveal ('Marine'), both deriving from cov 'sea'. However, Hrach Martirosyan interprets *Covean as 'lightning/thunder goddess of the celestial Purple Sea'.

According to Artin K. Shalian, Dzovinar either means 'a cloudless lightning shaft' or 'sea-born'.

Role

As a goddess
Yeganyan associates Tzovinar with the celestial waters or a primordial ocean, where the rain waters gather.

On the other hand, Armenian folklorist Manuk Abeghian interpreted her as "an angry storm goddess". According to Abeghian's studies, in the role of a storm goddess, she is described as having "fiery eyes". She also dances in the clouds riding on her horse, creating thunderstorms.

In epic
In the Armenian epic Sasna Cŕer (or Daredevils of Sassoun), a female character named Dzovinar or Covinar (dialectal 'lightning', according to Armen Petrosyan) functions as ancestress of a line of heroes that appear in later portions of the epic: by drinking of the spring or Kat'nov haxpür ('Milky Fountain'), she becomes pregnant with heroes Sanasar and Baghdasar. In another account, Covinar drinks a "milky liquid" that sprouts from a rock in the middle of Lake Van.

Parallels 
Russell sees a parallel between Covinar's impregnation episode with a similar event involving Ossetian character Satanaya, in the Nart sagas. It is also been suggested that both characters are remnants of Scythian goddess Api, described as a mother goddess tied to water.

See also 
Aramazd
Anahit
Vahagn
Astghik

References

External links
Armenian Mythology from the Tour Armenia site

Armenian goddesses
Sea and river goddesses
Sky and weather goddesses